Giovanni Francesco Maineri or Gianfrancesco de' Maineri (active 1489–1506) was an Italian painter of the Renaissance, active in Ferrara.

Putatively born in Parma to a painter Pietro de Maineri. He worked in Ferrara for the ruling Este family. His style recalls that of the contemporary Ercole de' Roberti. Lorenzo Costa, another Roberti pupil, completed an altarpiece by Maineri, when the latter left for Mantua in 1498.

References

Date of birth unknown
Date of death unknown
15th-century Italian painters
Italian male painters
16th-century Italian painters
Painters from Ferrara
Italian Renaissance painters